Flos Carmeli (Latin, "Flower of Carmel") is a Marian Catholic hymn and prayer honouring Our Lady of Mount Carmel. 

In the Carmelite Rite of the Mass, this hymn was the sequence for the Feast of Saint Simon Stock (c. 1165 - 1265), and since 1663, for the Feast of Our Lady of Mount Carmel on 16 July throughout the Latin liturgical rites. Said to have been written by Saint Simon Stock himself, the prayer is taken from the first two stanzas of the hymn. Its name comes from its incipit.

Text
Various translations and musical settings exists besides the Gregorian chant one. Below is one version distinguished by "Tall vine blossom laden" in the second line.

References 
 Carmelite website 
 Latin prayers 

Marian devotions
Roman Catholic prayers
Latin-language Christian hymns